The fourth series of China's Got Talent, sponsored by Head & Shoulders, premiered on DragonTV on November 18, 2012.

Auditions

Auditions were held in Shanghai Concert Hall. In this series, it features four judges instead of three.  Jerry Huang, Dou Wentao, Xu Jinglei, Leon Lai, Yang Wei, Gao Xiaosong, and Annie Yi has all been featured throughout the auditions.

Top 16 Summary

The top 16 were shown at the end of January 6 episode. They will be performing in Beijing at Great Hall of the People.

Semifinals
The semifinals began on January 13, 2013. The Great Hall of the People in Beijing was the venue for the semifinals. 

Rules
When the contestant is performing, judges can press their buzzers if the judges dislike the performance. When all 4 buzzers is pressed, the contestant must stop.

When the contestant is finished with their performance, a media jury of 100 can vote by raising their signs that was given to them. The most votes from the jury's votes will be automatically be in the finals. For second finalist, each of 4 judges has a chance of giving 10 votes to the 7 remaining contestants. The contestant that gets the most votes advance to the final. For the third finalist, judges vote between the third and fourth place contestants, and choose the best. If the result is tied, it goes to the public vote.

Italics indicate the second stage where each judges gave 10 points to their favorites. The contestants with the most votes combined with the jury points and judges' points will be the second finalist of the week.

Week 1 (Jan 13, 2013)

Week 2 (Jan 20, 2013)

Italics indicate the second stage where each judges gave 10 points to their favorites. The contestants with the most votes combined with the jury points and judges' points will be the second finalist of the week.

Finals (Venue: Mercedes-Benz Arena)

Rules

Before the final 6 acts performed one last time, the judges picked two more contestants from the semifinals to the finals for second chance. They were Ma Ziyue and Zhang Qianyun. Each 8 acts will perform for the judges and the judges will decide who will make it to the next stage. It is based on best of six. The second stage is by text voting by the Chinese public and it will determine the final four. The third stage will determine who is the top 2 and this is picked by the judges. The last stage, 101 selected jury will determine who is the winner. The individual who reaches 51 points will declared winner.

References

External links
China's Got Talent (En: ChinasGotTalent.org)

2013 Chinese television seasons
China's Got Talent